ANO3 is a gene that in humans is located on chromosome 11 and encodes the protein anoctamin 3.  It belongs to a family of genes (ANO1–ANO10) that appear to encode calcium-activated chloride channels.

Clinical significance 

Mutations in ANO3 have been linked to a form of autosomal dominant cranio-cervical dystonia (also known as DYT23), which presents as abnormal twisting or tremulous movements of the face, voice, head and upper limbs.

References 

Genes on human chromosome 11